Digdarshan was the first periodical of Bengal in Bangla language. It was a monthly periodical published by the Srirampur 
(Serampore) Baptist Mission and edited by John Clark Marshman who was the son of missionary Joshua Marshman. Its first issue was published in April 1818.

References 

Baptist Christianity in India
Bengali-language newspapers published in India
Publications established in 1818
Baptist newspapers
1818 establishments in British India
English-language newspapers published in India
Defunct newspapers published in India